Laurie Strongin is an American author and medical research campaigner.

Strongin is the author of Saving Henry: A Mother's Journey. The 2010 book tells the story of her family's pioneering use of in vitro fertilization and preimplantation genetic diagnosis to try to save the life of her son, Henry Strongin Goldberg, who was born with the genetic disease Fanconi anemia. In December 2002, Henry ultimately died of the disease and complications related to a bone marrow transplant. Prior to his death, Henry was profiled in a New York Times magazine cover story and an episode of ABC News' Nightline.

In the years after her son's death, Strongin became an advocate for relaxing the ban on federal support for stem cell research. She and her husband, Allen Goldberg, appeared with then-House Minority Leader Nancy Pelosi (D-CA) and Rep. Diana DeGette (D-CO) in a press conference to urge the passage the Senate companion legislation to the House of Representatives' Stem Cell Research Enhancement Act of 2005.

Strongin also published an op-ed in The Washington Post on July 23, 2006, titled "Vetoing Henry", which took issue with President George W. Bush's veto a week earlier of Congress's attempt to remove funding restrictions on human embryonic stem cell research. This veto was the first of George W. Bush's presidency.

In addition to her advocacy work, Strongin founded a non-profit, Hope for Henry Foundation, that provides gifts and parties for children hospitalized around the country with life-threatening diseases. She was named a 2009 Energizer Keep Going Hall of Fame semifinalist.

References

External links
 Vetoing Henry, The Washington Post July 23, 2006
 Hope for Henry Foundation
 Saving Henry Video Channel on Vimeo

Living people
Bethesda-Chevy Chase High School alumni
Year of birth missing (living people)